Ballophilus filiformis is a species of centipede in the genus Ballophilus. It is found in Democratic Republic of the Congo.

References 

Ballophilidae
Animals described in 1953
Arthropods of the Democratic Republic of the Congo